The  was a Japanese amphibious landing craft of World War II. The first prototype was completed in late 1943 and trials were conducted off Kure in March 1944.

History
Japan's combat experience in the Solomon Islands in 1942 which revealed the difficulty of resupplying Japanese forces in such situations prompted the IJN to commence an amphibious tractor program in 1943, as the Ka-Tsu, which was designed by Commander Hori Motoyoshi of the Kure Naval Yard.

Design

The Ka-Tsu's primary purpose was to transport cargo and/or troops ashore. It had light armored shielding with a maximum of 10 mm. Its engine compartment and electric final drives were hermetically sealed, as it was intended to be launched from a submarine. The twin drive propeller shafts were designed to retract "into their ducts" once the vehicle reached the beach.

The first prototype was completed in late 1943 and trials were conducted off Kure in March 1944. By the time development had been completed, it was proposed that the Ka-Tsu be used to attack US battleships anchored in atolls (such as Ulithi), which could not readily be attacked using conventional means. It was proposed that a Ka-Tsu armed with a pair of torpedoes be dropped off by submarine away from the atoll, propel itself to the outer reef using its tracks, and then enter the lagoon on the inside of the reef. Tests were successfully carried out with a modified Ka-Tsu carrying two torpedoes on its deck, but the war ended before any such mission could be mounted and the Ka-Tsu deployed in combat. A total of 49 units were produced.

See also

Blockade Runner
Type 3 submergence transport vehicle
Ha-101 class submarine

Notes

References

External links
Taki's Imperial Japanese Army Page - Akira Takizawa

World War II armoured fighting vehicles of Japan
Imperial Japanese Navy
Landing craft
Tractors
Amphibious vehicles of World War II
Tracked amphibious vehicles
Amphibious military vehicles
Military vehicles of Japan
Blockades
Mitsubishi
Military vehicles introduced from 1940 to 1944
Armoured personnel carriers of WWII
Tracked armoured personnel carriers